

Varietas
 Parmena balteus var. gauthieri Stösklein, 1940
 Parmena balteus var. interrupta Pic, 1891

References

Parmenini
Beetles described in 1767
Taxa named by Carl Linnaeus